Nieme is a river in Lower Saxony, Germany that flows into the Weser in Bursfelde.

See also
List of rivers of Lower Saxony

References

Rivers of Lower Saxony
Bramwald
Rivers of Germany